Diómedes Peña Zúñiga (born 21 March 1976) is a retired Colombian football player.

Club career
Born in Robles, Valle del Cauca, Peña began playing as a central defender for local sides Alianza Robles, El Cóndor and Deportivo Pasto. He moved to Bolivia in 2001, where he played for Mariscal Brown, Iberoamericana, La Paz F.C. and Club Aurora through 2011. Peña also had a spell with KF Tirana in the Albanian Superliga from January 2006 up to January 2007, playing 21 games and scoring 2 goals in the league for the Albanian club, helping them win the Albanian Superliga and the Albanian Supercup. Peña was captain of La Paz, and had a brief spell as a player-manager during 2010.

References 

1976 births
Living people
Colombian footballers
Association football defenders
Deportivo Pasto footballers
Colombian expatriate footballers
Expatriate footballers in Bolivia
Club Bolívar players
Colombian expatriate sportspeople in Bolivia
Expatriate footballers in Albania
KF Tirana players
Colombian expatriate sportspeople in Albania
La Paz F.C. players
Club Aurora players
Sportspeople from Valle del Cauca Department
La Paz F.C. managers